The State Register of Heritage Places is maintained by the Heritage Council of Western Australia. , 60 places are heritage-listed in the Shire of West Arthur, of which three are on the State Register of Heritage Places.

List

State Register of Heritage Places
The Western Australian State Register of Heritage Places, lists the following three state registered places within the Shire of West Arthur:

Shire of West Arthur heritage-listed places
The following places are heritage listed in the Shire of West Arthur but are not State registered:

References

West Arthur
West Arthur